Kyle deCamp is American multimedia performance artist. A Bessie Award winning performer,  she has collaborated with Richard Foreman, The Builders Association, John Kelly, John Jesurun and Chris Kondek among others.

References

External links
 Website for Kyle deCamp

American performance artists
Bessie Award winners